Roman Danylak (December 29, 1930 – October 7, 2012) was a Canadian Ukrainian Catholic bishop.

Life 
Roman Danylak was born in Toronto, Canada on December 29, 1930.  He was ordained to the Catholic priesthood in 1957 at St. Josaphat's Seminary Chapel in Rome and ministered to Ukrainian Catholics in Canada. He received a licentiate of sacred theology from the Pontifical Urbaniana University and a doctorate of canon and civil law from the Pontifical Lateran University. From 1973–1990, Father Danylak served as a consultor to the Pontifical Commission for the Revision of Canon Law for the Eastern Churches.

In 1992, while serving as the rector of St. Josaphat Cathedral and chancellor of the eparchal chancery, he was appointed Apostolic administrator sede plena of the Ukrainian Catholic Eparchy of Toronto and titular bishop of Nyssa by Pope John Paul II. His appointment proved controversial, as the incumbent bishop, 81-year-old Isidore Borecky, refused to retire even though he had passed the mandatory retirement age of 75 established by canon law. It was also rumored that Borecky had requested a coadjutor or auxiliary bishop, not an administrator, and that Father Danylak had not been nominated for the position by the Ukrainian Synod. After six years of conflict between the two bishops, Bishop Lubomyr Husar, Apostolic administrator of Lviv, negotiated a resolution whereby Borecky retired and Danylak was reassigned to "special responsibilities in Rome", resulting in the vacancy of the Toronto eparchy effective June 24, 1998. Bishop Cornelius Pasichny of Saskatoon was appointed the new bishop on July 1 of that year.

In Rome, Danylak served as a canon of the Basilica di Santa Maria Maggiore.

Danylak died at age 81 in Toronto on October 7, 2012.

Views 

During his retirement in Italy, Danylak supported certain claims by individuals to have seen visions of Jesus and Mary, claims about which the Holy See or the bishop holding responsibility as ordinary had expressed reservations or an explicitly negative judgement:
The Garabandal apparitions
Maria Valtorta's Poem of the Man God
 Alleged miracle in Naju, Korea

References

External links 

Bishops of the Ukrainian Greek Catholic Church
Canadian Eastern Catholic bishops
Canon law jurists
1930 births
2012 deaths